Ingrid Filippa Angeldal (born 14 July 1997), known as Filippa Angeldahl, is a Swedish professional footballer who plays as a midfielder for Manchester City and the Sweden national team.

Club career
Angeldahl's performances for Hammarby won her the 2017 Damallsvenskan Most Valuable Player award. Shortly afterwards she was transferred to League champions Linköpings FC.

On 2 September 2021, it was announced that Angeldahl had signed a two-year deal with the option of a further year with English FA WSL side Manchester City.

International career
At the 2018 Algarve Cup, Angeldahl made her debut for the senior Sweden team, playing in fixtures against South Korea and Russia.

Career statistics

Club

International 

Scores and results list Sweden's goal tally first, score column indicates score after each Angeldahl goal.

Honours
Manchester City
Women's League Cup: 2021–22

Private life 
Angeldahl is engaged to sport agent Megan Brakes.

References

External links

 
 Filippa Angeldal at Linköpings FC

1997 births
Living people
Swedish women's footballers
Linköpings FC players
Damallsvenskan players
Women's association football midfielders
AIK Fotboll (women) players
Hammarby Fotboll (women) players
Sweden women's international footballers
Footballers at the 2020 Summer Olympics
Olympic footballers of Sweden
Olympic medalists in football
Medalists at the 2020 Summer Olympics
Olympic silver medalists for Sweden
Footballers from Uppsala
UEFA Women's Euro 2022 players
Swedish LGBT sportspeople
LGBT association football players
Lesbian sportswomen
21st-century Swedish LGBT people